Senčak is a small settlement in the Slovene Hills in the Municipality of Sveti Tomaž in northeastern Slovenia. Part of the settlement is in the adjacent Municipality of Juršinci. The area belonged to the traditional region of Styria. It is now included in the Drava Statistical Region.

References

External links
Senčak on Geopedia

Populated places in the Municipality of Sveti Tomaž